Loos is a commune in the Nord department in northern France (Hauts-de-France).

It is located in the European Metropolis of Lille, and is a suburb of the city of Lille, bordering it on its southwest side. In 2018, Loos had a population of 22,426.

The town hall of Loos, with its large belfry, was inscribed on the UNESCO World Heritage List in 2005 in recognition of its historical importance to municipal power in Europe.

Population

Heraldry

Town twinning
Loos is twinned with Geseke, Germany.

See also
Communes of the Nord department

References

External links

Official website 

Communes of Nord (French department)
French Flanders